São João de Tarouca is a civil parish in the municipality of Tarouca, Portugal. The population in 2011 was 606 and population density was 27 inhabitants per square kilometre, in an area of 22.46 km2.

Gallery

References 

Freguesias of Tarouca
Populated places in Viseu District